Deopham is a village and civil parish in the English county of Norfolk. Deopham is located 3.9 miles west of Wymondham and 12 miles south-west of Norwich.

History
Deopham's name is of Anglo-Saxon origin and derives from the Old English for a homestead close to a deep body of water, likely the nearby Sea Mere.

In the Domesday Book, Deopham is listed as a settlement of 75 households in the hundred of Forehoe. In 1086, the village was divided between the estates of William de Warenne and Ralph de Beaufour.

RAF Deopham Green opened in 1943 for use by the United States Army Air Forces during the Second World War. The base was originally home rear echelon units until it was handed over to the 452nd Operations Group of the Eighth Air Force flying B-17 Flying Fortresses against strategic targets in Continental Europe. In October 1945, the base reverted to the Royal Air Force which closed the base in 1948 and allowed it to revert to agricultural use.

Geography
According to the 2011 Census, Deopham is a village of 541 residents living in 231 households.

Deopham falls within the constituency of Mid Norfolk and is represented at Parliament by George Freeman MP of the Conservative Party.

St. Andrew's Church
Deopham's parish church is dedicated to Saint Andrew and has a church tower dating back to the Fifteenth Century. The interior of the church was largely remodelled in the Seventeenth and Nineteenth Centuries.

Notable Residents
Messenger Monsey- humorist and physician to the Royal Hospital Chelsea

War Memorial
Deopham's war memorial takes the form of a carved marble plaque embossed with a crown and crucifix inside St. Andrew's Church. The memorial lists the following names for the First World War:
 Lance-Corporal Percy R. Hurrell (d.1917), 1/4th Battalion, Royal Norfolk Regiment
 Private Alfred W. Barrett (1897-1915), 1st Battalion, Duke of Cornwall's Light Infantry
 Private Harry Kerry (1877-1915), 1st Battalion, Essex Regiment
 Private Albert J. Morter (d.1918), 2nd Battalion, Suffolk Regiment

References

External links

Villages in Norfolk
Civil parishes in Norfolk
South Norfolk